Eduard Nasibovich Sturki (born 9 August 1993) is a Russian football player. He also holds Armenian citizenship.

In 2014, he changed his last name from Tatoyan (Eduard Nasibovich Tatoyan;) to Sturki.

Club career
He made his debut in the Russian Professional Football League for FC Volga-Olimpiyets Nizhny Novgorod on 21 August 2015 in a game against FC Nosta Novotroitsk.

He made his Russian Football National League debut for FC Sokol Saratov on 6 May 2017 in a game against FC Yenisey Krasnoyarsk.

Honours
Pyunik
Armenian Independence Cup winner: 2012–13

References

External links
 Profile by Russian Professional Football League

1993 births
Sportspeople from Krasnodar
Living people
Russian footballers
Russian people of Armenian descent
Armenian footballers
Russia youth international footballers
Armenia youth international footballers
FC Pyunik players
Association football defenders
Association football midfielders
FC Sokol Saratov players
FC Kuban Krasnodar players
FC Mordovia Saransk players
FC Khimki players
FC Nizhny Novgorod (2015) players
FC Ararat Moscow players
Crimean Premier League players